R Tools for Visual Studio (RTVS) is a plug-in for the Microsoft Visual Studio integrated development environment (IDE), used to provide support for programming in the language R. It supports IntelliSense, debugging, plotting, remote execution, SQL integration, and more. It is distributed as free and open-source software under the Apache License 2.0, and is developed mainly by Microsoft.

The first version released was 0.3 on March 5, 2016, and the current (version 1.0) was released in 2017. However, the project is described as "not actively supported" since February 2019.

See also
 R interfaces
 Python Tools for Visual Studio

References

External links

Free and open-source software
Integrated development environments
Microsoft free software
Software using the Apache license
2016 software
Windows-only free software